The 1981–82 Midland Football Combination season was the 45th in the history of Midland Football Combination, a football competition in England.

Division One

Division One featured 20 clubs which competed in the division last season along with two new clubs, promoted from Division Two:
Northfield Town
Stratford Town

League table

References

1981–82
8